Simonas (shortened as Simas) is a Lithuanian masculine given name, a cognate of Simon, and may refer to:
Simonas Daukantas (1793–1864), a Lithuanian writer, ethnographer and historian
Simonas Krėpšta (born 1984), a Lithuanian orienteering competitor
Simonas Martynas Kosakovskis (1741–1794), a Polish-Lithuanian nobleman and military commander 
Monsignor Simonas Morkūnas (1902–1997), a Lithuanian-born American priest
Simonas Serapinas (born 1982), a Lithuanian professional basketball forward
Simonas Stanevičius (1799–1848), a Lithuanian writer and a nationalist activist 

Lithuanian masculine given names